The Ego Has Landed Tour is the second concert tour by British recording artist, Robbie Williams. The tour promoted his debut album, Life thru a Lens, and saw Williams performing at bigger venues than his earlier Show Off Must Go On Tour. The singer also performed at several UK music festivals during the summer of 1998.

Setlist
"Let Me Entertain You"
"I Wouldn't Normally Do This Kind of Thing"
"Clean"
"South of the Border"
"Baby Girl Window"
"One of God's Better People"
"There She Goes"
"Killing Me"
"Life Thru a Lens"
"Teenage Millionaire"
"Lazy Days"
"Ego a Go Go"
"Old Before I Die"
"Angels"
"Back for Good"

Tour dates

Festivals and other miscellaneous performances
This concert was a part of the "Glastonbury Festival"
This concert was a part of "Parkpop"
This concert is a part of "T in the Park"
These concerts were a part of "V98"
This concert was a part of the "Slane Concert"

External links
Robbie Williams' Official Website

References

Robbie Williams concert tours
1998 concert tours